Beny Wagner (born 1985) is a German artist, filmmaker and author. He is known for his films Constant and A Demonstration.

Early life and education 
Wagner was born in 1985 in Berlin.

Wagner graduated with a bachelor of arts from Bard College in 2008, and was a postgraduate fellow at Jan van Eyck Academie in 2015-2016.

Career

He was a lecturer of fine arts at the Gerrit Rietveld Academie, between 2017 and 2021. His debut short film Eye Farm, premiered at the International Film Festival Rotterdam in 2017.

In 2020, Wagner co-directed A Demonstration, together with his long-term collaborator Sasha Litvintseva, which premiered at the Berlin International Film Festival and screened at the Museum of the Moving Image and the Vancouver International Film Festival. The film was the first of their Monsters, Measures, and Metabolisms project.

In 2022, he collaborated again with Sasha Litvintseva on Constant, which premiered at the International Film Festival Rotterdam and screened at CPH:DOX and the Open City Documentary Festival. The film documents how officialdom dictates how things are measured, and incorporates a range of cinematographic techniques, including photogrammetry and  360-degree cameras.

As of February 2023, the team were working on the feature film My Want of You Partakes of Me, the final film in the trilogy.

Filmography

Publications 
 2021 – All Thoughts Fly: Monster, Taxonomy, Film (co-written with Sasha Litvintseva)
 2011 – Part-Time Pioneer

Awards and nominations

References

External links
 
 
 Monsters, Measures and Metabolisms

Living people
1985 births
German documentary filmmakers
20th-century German male artists
German writers
Artists from Berlin
Writers from Berlin
Bard College alumni